Penny Hill or Pennyhill may refer to:

People 
 Penny Hill (musician)

Places
 Pennyhill, Delaware, USA
 Pennyhill Park Hotel, England
 Penny Hill, Calderdale, a location in West Yorkshire, England
 Penny Hill, Leeds, a place in Hunslet, West Yorkshire, England
 Penny Hill, Lincolnshire, a location in England

See also 
 Penn Hill, England
 Penn Hills, Pennsylvania, USA
 Penn Hills Resort, USA